Cascade Christian Schools (CCS) is a district of private schools in Pierce County, Washington, United States. They are three elementary school campuses in (Puyallup, Frederickson, and the Sumner-Orting Valley) three early learning centers, and a junior high/high school, providing Christ-centered education for approximately 1700 students. Their motto is "To glorify God by providing an excellent Christ-centered education dedicated to developing discerning leaders who are spiritually, personally, and academically prepared to impact their world".

History
Officially founded in 1992 by three church affiliated schools in Pierce County, Cascade Christian Schools began educating students in a nondenominational Christian environment in the fall of 1993. CCS had its first graduating class in the spring of 1994.

Athletics
Cascade Christian participates in 1A sports in the Nisqually league in football, baseball, wrestling, fastpitch, volleyball, track and field, cross-country, basketball (men's and women's), soccer (men's and women's), tennis (men's and women's), and golf (men's and women's).

The CCS mascot is the Cougar.

The CCS high school football team plays at Sunset Stadium in Sumner.  The other high school teams play in the Junior High/High School gymnasium, performing arts center, or on the school's track area.

Notable athletic accomplishments include:
2010, 2011 WIAA 1-A High School Boys' Basketball State Champions
2009 Woman's Golf state champions 
2008–2010 WIAA Cheerleading state champions, small category
2010, 2014 WIAA 1-A High School Football state champions

Notable alumni
 Ryan Moore - professional golfer on the PGA Tour; graduated in 2001

References

External links
Home page
http://seattletimes.com/html/highschoolsports/2014413454_prepboys06.html Cascade Christian repeats in 1A Boys' Basketball] Seattle Times, March 5, 2011

Schools in Pierce County, Washington
Private elementary schools in Washington (state)
Private middle schools in Washington (state)
High schools in Pierce County, Washington
Private high schools in Washington (state)